The LSWR 348 class was a class of passenger  steam locomotives designed by W. G. Beattie to replace his father's 2-4-0 classes on the Salisbury-Exeter expresses of the  London and South Western Railway. The class proved to be an abject failure, resulting in W.G. Beattie's early retirement in December 1877.

Design and construction
This was the only original design by William G. Beattie, as the other locomotives delivered during his period as locomotive superintendent were either built to his father's designs or else from the drawing boards of the manufacturers. The design incoproated several new features including Beattie's own design of divided firebox and piston valves. They were also built with continuous splashers on each side similar to a side tank, thereby creating a rather ungainly appearance.

William Beattie was required to supply a larger locomotive type when it became clear to the Directors of the railway that the existing 2-4-0 designs were no longer able to keep time on the difficult main line route between Salisbury and Exeter. Five locomotive builders were approached, but of these one refused to tender and two others suggested major modifications to the design. No prototype of the design was constructed, but twenty examples were ordered from Sharp, Stewart and Company in June 1876, directly from the drawing board. These were numbered 348 to 367.

Performance issues
As soon as the locomotives were delivered between March and June 1877, they were found to lack the capacity to raise sufficient steam, were unsteady at speed, and suffered from frequent mechanical failures. Beattie claimed that these were due to poor standards of workmanship and materials used in their construction, but the manufacturers reported to the directors that the problems were rather due to design flaws. These included: a badly designed firebox providing an inadequate heating surface for the cylinder size; poor smokebox design creating an inadequate draft; badly designed and inadequately lubricated piston valves; and insufficient cushioning of the bogies. According to C. Hamilton Ellis, the class were ‘unfortunate engines; they were over-cylindered and the piston valves with which they were originally fitted gave constant trouble’, also that they ‘were bad steamers.’ Beattie attempted to rectify these defects at Nine Elms works but by December 1877 only four of the twenty new locomotives were serviceable. The directors therefore accepted William Beattie's resignation on health grounds.

Adams Improvements
William Adams, William Beattie's successor as Locomotive Superintendent, attempted to improve the performance of the class in 1878, . He did this by substituting smaller cylinders, Slide valves, a smaller chimney, a conventional firebox and a modified smokebox. The opportunity was also taken to divide the splashers on each side to improve their appearance. Four locomotives were thus treated which performed a lot better, ‘but the vagaries of the new express engines were such that they did very little main-line work and a number of them were afterwards sent down to Portsmouth for use on the slower trains.’

Despite their use of lighter and slower trains, the repair bills for the class continued to be unacceptably high and so Adams decided to rebuild the entire class using new cylinders and his ’Jubilee class’ boiler. Eight of the class were so treated during 1888 and 1889 but this programme ceased when it was found to be more cost-effective to build new Jubilee locomotives. The un-rebuilt locomotives were withdrawn and scrapped between 1889 and 1898, and those that had been rebuilt between 1890 and 1905. The boilers from the latter group were salvaged and re-used on ’Jubilee class’, and T1 class locomotives.

References

348
4-4-0 locomotives
Sharp Stewart locomotives
Railway locomotives introduced in 1877
Scrapped locomotives
Standard gauge steam locomotives of Great Britain